Herodorus of Megara was an ancient Greek musician, ten times Olympic victor in the trumpet contest. He was noted particularly for his size and the loudness of his trumpet (salpinx) playing.

References
Athenaeus. x. p. 414, f, 415, e.)
Pollux Onom. IV II
Curiosities of Music - Rare facts about the music traditions of many nations & cultures  
 Smith, William; Dictionary of Greek and Roman Biography and Mythology, London (1873). "Herodo'rus" 

Ancient Megarians
4th-century BC Greek people
Ancient Greek musicians
Ancient Olympic competitors
Ancient Greek trumpeters